The 1. Liga Futsalu is the premier  futsal league in the Czech Republic, is organized by Football Association of the Czech Republic.

Champions

Titles

External links
Official site
www.efutsal.cz
futsalplanet.com 

Futsal competitions in the Czech Republic
Czech Republic
futsal
Sports leagues established in 1992
Professional sports leagues in the Czech Republic